Maria Martika (15 May 1932 – 1 June 2018), was a Greek stage, television, and film actress. She became known for the series We and We, To Retire and Penthouse.

Martika was born in Athens, outside the Attica Basin, and studied at the Elementary School and the Exataxi Gymnasium. She graduated from the Karolos Koun Drama School in 1961. She died in her native Athens on 1 June 2018 at the age of 86.

References

Links
 Profile, imdb.com; accessed 8 June 2018.

1932 births
2018 deaths
Greek film actresses
Greek stage actresses
Greek television actresses
Actresses from Athens